Driss Roukhe (born July 5, 1968) is a Moroccan actor and director.

Early life
Roukhe was born in Dyour Jdad B’ni M’Hamed, a poor neighborhood of Meknes, and lost his father when he was 7. He practiced theater in high-school and with various youth associations. He later joined the Institut supérieur d’art dramatique et d’animation culturelle (ISADAC) where he was formally trained as an actor.

He first appeared in the Moroccan director Ahmed Essyad's opera, Le Collier des ruses, in 1993.

Works

Films
 Un aller simple (2001) as Omar
 La chambre noire (2004)
 Le Regard (2005) as Ramzi
 Syriana (2005) as Guard
 Babel (2006) as Alarid
 The Situation (2006) as Walid
 Les Anges de Satan (2007) as Kader
 Rendition (2007) as Bahi
 Arn: The Knight Templar (2007) as Fakhr
 Number One (2008) as Toro
 Arn – The Kingdom at Road's End (2008) as Fakhr
 Secret défense (2008) as Natrif
 Gud, lukt och henne (2008)
 Casanegra (2008) as Adil's stepfather
 Die zwei Leben des Daniel Shore (2009) as Commandant
 Green Zone (2010) as Tahir al-Malik
 37 Kilometers Celsius  (Short) (2009)
 Pegase (2011) as Chrif
 Agadir Bombay (2011)
 Love in the Medina (2011) as the Le Mokkadem
 Ben X (2011)
 Or noir (2011) as Magrouf (English title: Day of the Falcon)
 L'enfant cheikh (2012)
 Agent Hamilton: But Not If It Concerns Your Daughter (2012) as Arahan 
  Entropya (Short)  (2013) as Husband 
 Traitors (2013) as Haj 
 L'esclave Du Mâle (Short) (2014) as Chief Inspector Bougati

Television
 The Passion (TV serial) episode #1.2 (2008) as Roman Soldier at Procession
 The Grid'' (TV mini-series) (2004) as Saudi Customs Officer

References

External links

Official website 

1968 births
Living people
People from Meknes
Moroccan male television actors
Moroccan male film actors
Moroccan film directors
21st-century Moroccan male actors